INS Savitri (P53) is a Sukanya class patrol vessel of the Indian Navy.

References

Sukanya-class patrol vessels
Patrol vessels of the Indian Navy
Naval ships of India